Tarek al-Zumar is an Egyptian Islamist politician and the secretary-general of the Building and Development Party. The party has a non-political wing named al-Gama'a al-Islamiyya. Al-Zumar was a member of Egyptian Islamic Jihad. His cousin is Aboud El Zomor, who was imprisoned along with him.

Al-Zumar was imprisoned in 1984 following the assassination of Anwar Sadat and was released during the Egyptian Revolution of 2011. 

Al-Zumar and his cousin received a hero's welcome when they were released from prison before things turned. On 14 July 2013 Egypt's prosecutor general Hisham Barakat ordered his assets to be frozen. Afterwards, al-Zumar fled to Qatar.

References

Year of birth missing (living people)
Living people
Egyptian Islamists
Egyptian prisoners and detainees
Egyptian emigrants to Qatar